Rin Tohsaka (Japanese: 遠坂 凛, Hepburn: Tōsaka Rin) is a fictional character introduced in the 2004 visual novel Fate/stay night by Type-Moon. Rin is a high school student who becomes the master mage of Archer, a spirit warrior. Together they participate in a war between other mages and warriors known as the Holy Grail War. In all routes of the visual novel, she meets and allies with rookie mage Shirou Emiya, two of them then form a romantic relationship in the novel's second route, Unlimited Blade Works, in which Rin is the main heroine. Outside the visual novel, Rin has appeared in printed and animated adaptations. She is also present in the prequel Fate/Zero, a series of light novels written by Gen Urobuchi, and multiple video games based on the Fate/stay night series.

In Japanese, Rin is voiced by Kana Ueda. In English, Rin is voiced by Mela Lee in nearly every single incarnation of the series, except for Fate/kaleid liner Prisma Illya, where Lee is replaced by Carli Mosier due to said series being licensed by Sentai Filmworks. Critical reaction to Rin's character has been generally positive, with several writers finding her one of the best characters in the animated adaptations of the visual novel. Her relationship with Shirou has also earned praise and has appeared in multiple popularity polls from the series and anime in general.

Creation and design
In the original version of the Fate/stay night visual novel, written by Type-Moon founder Kinoko Nasu while studying at a high school, one of the opponents of the main protagonist Ayaka Sajyo was a ″princess type girl″, who was the master of Lancer. According to Nasu, this girl had a special ″laughing archetype″, which was similar to Luviagelita Edelfelt, a character from the sequel Fate/hollow ataraxia. However, after the protagonist's gender was changed and renamed as Shirou Emiya, Nasu and leading Type-Moon artist Takashi Takeuchi decided to completely rewrite the character of Lancer's master.

As a result, Nasu decided to make this heroine a positive character. On the advice of Takeuchi, she decided to change her temperament to be similar to that of Aoko Aozaki, a character from his earlier novel, Mahoutsukai no Yoru. According to the screenwriter, his heroines were based on Aoko Aozaki (including Rin, Azaka Kokuto from Kara no Kyoukai, and Akiha Tohno from Tsukihime), it was Rin who was the closest to the original character of Aoko. Initially, Nasu believed that this new heroine was too similar to Aozaki. Still, Takeuchi convinced him not to depart from the concept and explained the similarity between Rin and Aoko as a mental relation. Rin had a troubling background, facing financial problems due to the death of her parents in the background of the game. To further define Rin's character, the screenwriter decided to give multiple sides to her personality, designing her as a beautiful woman who would be primarily cute and courageous while at other times swearing and acting aggressively. According to Takeuchi, such a move with the divergence of Rin's appearance and behaviour was made to make her more attractive and adorable for fans.

While designing Rin's visual appearance, Takashi Takeuchi worked with the goal of making her ″possess a sense of perfection and a surrounding atmosphere of inaccessibility″. Takeuchi regarded Rin as a model student and therefore sought to draw a school uniform that would fit her better than any other female character of the game. At the same time, her outside school clothes were designed in a more casual style, that was explained as ″more comfortable for battles″. All of Rin's clothes were drawn in red to match the suit of her servant — Archer. Takeuchi originally planned to emphasize Rin's temper with a special raised eye shape, used in the anime industry for portraying cold-blooded and sharp characters, but in the final version, her eyes are round. Takeuchi also designed her hair with pigtails, believing that this suited her tsundere nature.

After the release of Fate/stay night, Nasu felt that Rin had received the most complete character compared to the other heroes of the game and was his favourite heroine in the visual novel. However, according to the writer, while writing scenes with Rin, he was under severe pressure from Takeuchi and other Type-Moon participants who placed greater emphasis on Saber and Rider. In the end, Nasu decided to make Rin contrast to Saber, perceived as an ideal girl in her eyes. Takeuchi was also pleased with Rin's final character, as well as the appearance of the prerequisites for this heroine's romantic relationship not only with Shirou, but also with Archer and Lancer, and called Rin a ″face of Fate, but in a different sense than Saber”. Nasu stated that "with a girl like that by his side, even an unsociable person like Shirou loses his presence of mind." 

In the making of the Unlimited Blade Works anime, Ufotable and Nasu agreed to keep her original looks from the visual novel believing it was still considered appealing. Since Nasu found the original Rin too unsociable and decided that the Rin from the anime should be more social. In order to further develop the new characterization of Shirou Emiya, Ufotable paid attention to the way Rin and Shirou interacted, leading to the latter expressing more joy than in the original version. 

Voice actress Kana Ueda noted that when first voicing Rin, she had a sense of incompatibility with the character. As a result, while the director expressed a similar opinion, Ueda's experience helped her to further connect with Rin. She further described her character as "kind of like the onee-san (elder sister) character, where she is responsible for guiding Shiro through his adventure". English actress Mela Lee regarded Rin, alongside Rozen Maidens Shinku and Blade of the Immortals Rin Asano, as one of the works where her career improved.

Character
Rin specializes in the transformation of energy, which includes the storage of Mana in objects. She stores her Mana in jewels that she regularly charges to bypass her body's natural limitations on releasing energy. She can detonate her jewels on contact with an object, resulting in a release of energy equivalent to an "A" rank attack. Her most common offensive spell is Gandr, which fires concentrated Mana in the form of a black orb from her finger.  On contact, the spell amplifies physical conditions—a person who is already sick, for example, becomes far sicker upon being hit, but she can imbue it with such power that it instantly knocks weaker beings out on contact.  Rin is also proficient with reinforcement sorcery, which she uses on her legs to give herself more speed or strengthen her fists so as to better implement her karate. She is known to be somewhat of a prodigy in mage craft. While most mages are proficient at one, sometimes two elements, Rin possesses the very rare trait of being equally skilled in all five and is thus known as an Average One.

Appearances
Rin is a model student and idol of Shirou's school. She barely talks to other students in her school and exhibits a desire to be left alone, as exemplified by her tendency to stay on the school's rooftop, away from the rest of the students.  She is also secretly a mage and a Master in the Fifth Holy Grail War. In the beginning of the anime, she summons Archer as her Servant, although she originally wanted to summon Saber. Rin is reared as the successor to her family's magecraft, instructed by her father, Tokiomi Tohsaka, to prioritize sorcery over her own interests. When she was young, Rin was separated from her sister Sakura, who was given to the Matou family for adoption. After her father is killed in the Fourth Holy Grail War, Rin continues to perfect her sorcery with some guidance from her guardian, Kirei Kotomine. Several years later, she and Sakura observed a young Shirou Emiya attempting to jump over a high bar for a fitness test, and secretly liked to be with him due to his dogged perseverance. She strives to earn the admiration of her peers to avoid drawing attention to her private life, even though she is secretly stingy, tomboyish, and a perfectionist. She is perceptive, resourceful and avidly competitive.

In the Fate route as well as the first anime adaptation, after the encounter with Berserker, Rin suggests a temporary truce with Shirou to deal with the servant and his master. Over the course of this, she becomes a close friend of Shirou and occasionally worries about him. The Unlimited Blade Works route places her as a heroine, where she and Shirou enter a romantic relationship. In the True end, they travel to England to study magecraft at the Clocktower after Saber destroys the Holy Grail. In the Good end, she lives peacefully with Shirou and Saber as her familiar, supplying the latter with Mana.  In the Heaven's Feel route, her relationship with her sister, Sakura is expanded upon. She battles Sakura but later allows herself to be struck while she apologizes, hugging Sakura and expressing her true sisterly love. In the True End of the route, she travels to England to stand trial at a kangaroo court for her actions in the Holy Grail War and later comes back to visit Shirou, Sakura, and Rider after she becomes the apprentice of the Wizard Marshall Zelretch, who saved her from prosecution at the last second.

Outside the original visual novel, Rin has been featured in two fighting games based on the events of Fate/stay night: Fate/unlimited codes, released in 2008 for arcades and the PlayStation 2, and Fate/tiger colosseum, released in 2007 for the PlayStation Portable. In the light novel prequel Fate/Zero, Rin is featured as a child who is obsessed with learning her father's spells. In the final chapters, Kirei reveals to Rin that her father died, and gives her a knife. Outside Type-Moon's works and adaptations, she also appears in the video game Divine Gate.

In the spinoff Fate/kaleid liner Prisma Illya, Rin is featured as a young sorceress sent by the wizard Kischur Zelretch Schweinorg to Japan in order to capture the Class Cards using the powers of a Magical Girl. After Ruby abandons her for Illya, Rin forces Illya to accomplish her mission in her stead, all while guiding and supervising Illya. Though normally competent, her constant fighting with Luvia often causes them to create various embarrassing blunders, leaving Illya and Miyu with a negative opinion of their skills.

Rin has appeared in the anime and manga versions of Fate/stay night, the movie Unlimited Blade Works (2010), and the ones from Heaven's Feel. Rin is also present in the side game Capsule Servant alongside Shirou as playable characters. In promoting the animated adaptations of Unlimited Blade Works, Rin was added to the game Summons Board and The Alchemist Code. She is also present in Phantasy Star Online 2.

Reception
Rin has been popular in Japan. In the Newtype top 30 characters of the 2010s, Rin was voted as the seventh most popular female character. In an Unlimited Blade Works poll she took third place. In the Type-Moon's 10th Anniversary Character Poll in 2012, Rin was ranked 4th. In 2015, Newtype readers voted her as the second best female character of the year behind Yukino Yukinoshita from My Teen Romantic Comedy SNAFU TOO!. Voice actress Kana Ueda noted that Rin was one of the most popular characters she has ever voiced due to how fans often ask her to include her name during autograph sessions. In a Manga Tokyo poll from 2018, Rin was voted as the third most popular Fate character behind Shirou and Saber.

Critical reception to Rin's character in the first anime by Studio Deen was positive. THEM Anime Reviews enjoyed Rin's characterization in the first Fate/stay night anime, due to her personality described as "direct, blunt and generally takes a no-nonsense attitude to the whole war". The character has often been described as a tsundere, an archetype of fictional characters who react ashamed and angry when interacting with people they cherish. Mania Entertainment's Chris Beveridge liked Rin's interactions with Shirou and Saber in the first anime despite lacking Archer. IGN found Rin and Archer's alliance with Shirou and Saber unlikely, as in the end the duos are supposed to fight each other. Anime News Network stated that while in the first series Rin and Shirou get the opportunity to stand out in fights, they are overshadowed by Archer. However, in a following review, the same site stated that Rin in general "steals the show" thanks to her skills and her sex appeal. Capsule Monster noted that while the use of many female characters including Rin might make the series feel like a harem, the plot managed to develop these characters in other ways. DVD Talk like how despite starting as enemies, both Rin and Shirou become allies to dangerous threats regardless of the former's constant talks that all Masters are rivals.

ANN criticized Rin's and Shirou's relationship in the movie Unlimited Blade Works as due to time issues, the movie does not expand on it. Blu Ray enjoyed the further relationship between Shirou and Rin as while they start as enemies, they become closer as the story progresses.

The television series produced by Ufotable earned bigger praise by UK Anime Network due to its bigger portrayal of Rin alongside Archer, calling them the best characters from the series. The Fandom Post agreed, finding her more appealing than Saber due to Rin's actions in the final episodes of the series. Japanator stated that Archer's betrayal towards Rin felt like a sad twist due to how the duo originally made a major understanding in the previous episodes. This made Rin's development take a sadder tone according to the reviewer. Anime News Network enjoyed the way the story between Rin and Shirou ended in Unlimited Blade Works, as their romance provided appeal; although the writer expressed concerns in whether or not Rin's comfort will stop Shirou from going to his path of becoming Archer into the future, as Rin is against this, while Shirou still believes in his ideals despite having accepted its flaws as previously explored in the anime series.

References

Anime and manga characters who use magic
Fate/stay night characters
Female characters in anime and manga
Female characters in video games
Fictional Japanese people in anime and manga
Fictional Japanese people in video games
Orphan characters in anime and manga
Orphan characters in video games
Video game characters who use magic
Video game characters introduced in 2004
Video game protagonists